Michael Radcliffe Ward (c. 1859, Alderley - ) was an English electrical engineer and automotive pioneer. After making engineering innovation in electric lighting, he went on to develop electric buses.

By 1879 Radcliffe Ward was working for the British Electric Light Company. In 1881 he designed a Gramme machine which could power could  4 to 6 arc lights of 4000 nominal candle power per light. In February of that year he ran some experiments at George's Pier Head, Liverpool along with Alderman Joseph Hubback, chairman of the light company. They used one of the Gramme machines along with a multitubular boiler and vertical engine supplied by Cochrane and Co. The light produced was mor effective in penetrating the fog than the pre-existing gas lights.

In 1882 Radcliffe Ward was named as the electrical engineer working for the Faure Electric Accumulator Company, working with the consultants William Edward Ayrton and Camille Alphonse Faure.

References

1859 births
Date of death missing
English electrical engineers
British automotive pioneers